Llangollen Rural is a community and electoral ward in Wrexham County Borough, Wales. It contains the villages of Froncysyllte, Garth, and Trevor, and had a population of 1,999 at the 2001 census, increasing to 2,059 at the 2011 Census. The Pontcysyllte aqueduct is a World Heritage Site. Although named Rural, it is actually densely populated. 

The area was, until 1974, the civil parish of Llangollen Rural, governed by Llangollen Rural Parish Council and located in the county of Denbighshire. It became the Community of Llangollen Rural under the terms of the Local Government Act 1972, which also saw it transferred into the new county of Clwyd. When the latter was abolished in 1996, Llangollen Rural was initially included in the new county of Denbighshire, but was transferred to Wrexham County Borough following a 1998 referendum.

The community elects or co-opts 10 community councillors to Llangollen Rural Community Council, at the lowest level of local government.

References

Communities in Wrexham County Borough
Wards of Wrexham County Borough